RGV Barracudas FC is an American soccer club based in Hidalgo, Texas. Founded in 2004 as an amateur team, the men's indoor squad made its professional debut at the Barracudas Sports Complex as the Brownsville Barracudas in the Major Arena Soccer League during the 2014–15 season. The club signed Luis Ángel Landín the following year, and that season advanced to the Division Final vs. Las Vegas Legends after his golden goal against Atlético Baja at Tijuana.

After taking the 2016–17 MASL season off to regroup, the Barracudas returned for the 2017–18 season as the Rio Grande Valley Barracudas, playing the State Farm Arena in Hidalgo. The RGV Barracudas signed Vicente Matias Vuoso during the 2017-2018 season.

On February 25, 2021, M2 announced the return of the team to the league to play in the 2021-2022 season after a brief hiatus.

The club's colors are blue and white; their home uniform, sponsored by Eletto Sport, is a royal blue shirt with a white collar and white shorts with blue socks.

Personnel

2018–19 roster

Active Players

Inactive Players

Staff
  Genoni Martinez –  Head coach
 Marco Antonio Coria – Assistant coach
 Tenoch Juarez – Assistant coach
 Alejandro Diaz – Trainer

Year-by-year

References

External links
Official website
Brownsville Barracudas at Our Sports Central
http://www.themonitor.com/sports/rgvfc_toros/article_f23ec672-4a58-11e7-a586-c373f30af994.html
http://espndeportes.espn.com/futbol/mls/nota/_/id/3738928/matias-vuoso-jugara-en-estados-unidos-con-barracudas-fc
http://www.mediotiempo.com/futbol/2017/11/25/matias-vuoso-ficha-con-barracudas-de-la-masl
https://www.debate.com.mx/deportes/Matias-Vuoso-ficha-con-Barracudas-FC-de-la-MASL-20171125-0303.html
https://www.univision.com/deportes/futbol/matias-vuoso-jugara-en-el-barracudas-fc-de-estados-unidos
https://www.si.com/soccer/2017/11/27/oficial-matias-vuoso-jugara-en-estados-unidos

 
2014 establishments in Texas
Association football clubs established in 2014
Indoor soccer clubs in the United States
Major Arena Soccer League teams
Sports in the Rio Grande Valley
Soccer clubs in Texas
2004 establishments in Texas
Association football clubs established in 2004